Wannian Temple may refer to:

 Wannian Temple (Mount Emei), at the foot of Camel Mountain Range of Mount E'mei, in Sichuan, China
 Wannian Temple (Tiantai County), at the foot of Mount Wannian, in Tiantai County, Zhejiang, China